The 2014 Harvard Crimson football team represented Harvard University in the 2014 NCAA Division I FCS football season. They were led by 21st-year head coach Tim Murphy and played their home games at Harvard Stadium. They were a member of the Ivy League. They finished the season 10–0 overall 7–0 in Ivy League play to be crowned Ivy League champions. Harvard averaged 15,017 fans per game.

Schedule

Ranking movements

References

Harvard
Harvard Crimson football seasons
Ivy League football champion seasons
College football undefeated seasons
Harvard Crimson football
Harvard Crimson football